ʽAmmuriya may refer to:

ʽAmmuriya, Jordan, a town in Jordan
ʽAmmuriya, Nablus, a village in the West Bank